Dan Webster Emmett (March 8, 1886 - September 7, 1966) served in the California State Assembly for the 60th district from 1929 to 1931 and 50th district from 1931 to 1933. During World War I he served in the United States Army.

References

United States Army personnel of World War I
1886 births
1966 deaths
Republican Party members of the California State Assembly